Neottia convallarioides is a species of orchid known by the common names broad-lipped twayblade and broad-leaved twayblade. It was formerly placed in the genus Listera, but molecular phylogenetic studies have shown that Neottia nidus-avis, the bird's-nest orchid, evolved within the same group, and all species of Listera have been moved to Neottia.

Description 
It is a rhizomatous perennial herb growing 10 to 35 centimeters tall. It has one pair of green oval leaves 2 to 7 cm long near the base of the stem. The inflorescence is a small raceme of green or yellow-green flowers. Each has 3 reflexed lance-shaped sepals, 2 similar petals, and a lobed, wedge-shaped labellum that measures 9 to 13 mm long. The plant sometimes forms large colonies, creating a groundcover. It is known to hybridize with Neottia auriculata.

Distribution and habitat 
Neottia convallarioides can be found in moist habitats such as woods, forests, swamps, and streambanks. It is native to much of Canada and in parts of the United States (Alaska, the Great Lakes Region, New England, and the mountains of the West: Rockies, Cascades, Sierra Nevada, etc.). It also reportedly occurs in St. Pierre & Miquelon and on the Komandor Islands in the Bering Sea, part of the Russian Far East.

References

External links
Jepson Manual Treatment
USDA Plants Profile
Flora of North America
Photo gallery

convallarioides
Orchids of North America
Orchids of Russia
Bering Sea
Flora of the United States
Flora of Canada
Flora of Saint Pierre and Miquelon
Plants described in 1800